The 2000 season saw the Utes sliding back again. They went 4–7, the worst W-L record since Ron McBride's first season in 1990.

Schedule

Roster

After the season

NFL draft
Two players went in the 2001 NFL Draft, including future pro bowler Steve Smith.

References

Utah
Utah Utes football seasons
Utah Utes football